Botanic Ridge is a suburb in Melbourne, Victoria, Australia, 45 km south-east of Melbourne's Central Business District, located within the City of Casey local government area.

The suburb is bounded in the north by Ballarto Road and the Royal Botanic Gardens, in the east by Craig Road, in the south by Browns Road and in the west by Pearcedale Road.

By 2009 the urban growth boundary had moved along Pearcedale and Browns Road, placing the western part of the suburb inside the main growth area. Two large scale housing developments, Botanic Ridge and Settlers Run Estate, have since developed in the area.

Golfers play at the course of Settlers Run Golf and Country Club at Settlers Run Estate.

See also
 City of Cranbourne – Botanic Ridge was previously within this former local government area.

References

Suburbs of the City of Casey